Centro de Investigación de la Universidad del Pacífico, or CIUP, as it is known in Peru, is an interdepartamental and interdisciplinary research unit through which the Universidad del Pacífico undertakes and disseminates research in Peru.

Strategic approaches
As a think tank, its mission is to contribute to the development and democratisation of Peru, in an increasingly diverse and interconnected world. CIUP aims to achieve this mission through the production of knowledge about current national and international issues, the generation of proposals of change, and influence on debates and public policies. Additionally, it aims to develop the future generation of public and private entrepreneurs and professionals.

In 2010, CIUP launched Agenda 2011 to influence the Peruvian 2011 presidential race with new evidence on key policy areas.

Areas of focus
CIUP works across six focus areas:
 Economic growth and development
 Regulation and competitivity
 Poverty and social policies
 Natural resources and the environment
 International relations
 Business management and corporate social responsibility

Present and past directors
 Its current director is Cynthia Sanborn
 Felipe Portocarrero

Notable alumni and researchers
 Mercedes Araoz – former Minister of finance, trade and production; also former presidential candidate
 Enrique Vasquez – former president of PRONAA
 Julio Velarde – president of the Central Bank of Peru

See also
Think tanks

External links
 Centro de Investigación de la Universidad del Pacífico

Research institutes in Peru